Blue Oyster together with Priscilla, which is directly connected to it, is a gay bar and night club in Saint-Petersburg, Russia. The name alludes both to the fictional gay bar from Police Academy series of comedy films, and to the Russian translation of the word "blue" – "голубой" – which is a slang name for gay people in Russian. The bar is open daily until the morning, and entrance is always free for men but may be restricted for women, and there is a tight face control. Together Blue Oyster and Priscilla have several bars situated on four floors, a karaoke room, dance floor, a lounge area and a dark labyrinth.

References

LGBT culture in Russia
LGBT nightclubs
Nightclubs in Russia